Flag of the Congo may refer to:

Flag of the Republic of the Congo
Flag of the Democratic Republic of the Congo